Justin Bastard Sane (aka Justin Sane) is an American comic book creator, film director, puppeteer and animator. His comic books are done in a silhouette style reminiscent of early film and his movies feature sex, violence and satirical comedy.

His two-part comic Heart of a Corpse is the nearly-silent story of a depressed young mortician's daughter and her deceased fiancé, who rises from his grave nightly due to a heart that never managed to decompose. It is published by Slave Labor Graphics. Bloody Dreadful, an ongoing horror anthology, and the social satire The Woodland Welfare Manifesto, are also published by SLG.

The most well known of his short films is Teddy Bears' Picnic (2006) (in which a very polite tea party for stuffed bears turns into a bloody cannibalistic feast) that appeared in Spike and Mike's Sick and Twisted Festival of Animation, Sane has also directed eight other shorts, including a humorous sock monkey porno, a shockingly bloody 1950s television satire and an absurdist "cartoon" about philosophical, and accident-prone, mice.

Comics Work
 Heart of a Corpse (2012)
 Bloody Dreadful (2013)
 The Woodland Welfare Manifesto (2014)

Short films
 The Secret Lives of Sock Monkeys (2004)
 A Day at the Circus (2005)
 Baby's Toast (2005)
 Teddy Bears' Picnic (2006)
 Eat the Johnsons (2008)
 Those Mental Mice in "Existence" (2008)
 Ubu Ingesting (2010)
 The Exquisite Corpse (2010)
 Last of the Dodos (2011)

External links
SLG Publishing
Heart of a Corpse at ComiXology
MRJUSTINSANE.COM - Official Comics Site
Spike and Mike's Sick and Twisted Festival of Animation site featuring Teddy Bears' Picnic.

Bizarre Magazine interview with Justin Bastard Sane regarding 'Eat the Johnsons'.

American comics writers
American film directors
American puppeteers
American animators
American animated film directors
1976 births
Living people